Theofilos Profyllidis (born 17 May 2002) is a Greek professional footballer who plays as a goalkeeper for the Super League 2 club Apollon Pontou.

Club career
Born in Thessaloniki, Greece, Profyllidis made his senior debut with the Super League Greece club Apollon Pontou in the 2019–20 season. He played his maiden club game on January 26, 2020, against Apollon Smyrnis, where he conceded five goals. Apollon Pontou lost the game 5–0.

Initially signed by the Greek club Apollon Pontou U19, he had no appearances for the senior squad until promotion to Apollon Pontou in 2019.

He has never played in the Greek Football Cup.

Career statistics

References

2002 births
Living people
Greek footballers
Association football goalkeepers
Apollon Pontou FC players
Super League Greece 2 players
Footballers from Thessaloniki